Gagliano is the name of a famous family of Italian luthiers from Naples, dating back to the early 18th century. The Gagliano dynasty –  particularly Alessandro, Nicolò I and Gennaro – are considered the high point of Neapolitan violin making. There are as many as eighteen  Gagliano violin makers known worldwide today. Below is a family tree of a few of its most recognizable luthiers.

Alessandro Gagliano
( 1700 –  1735) Naples, Italy. As a youth, Alessandro worked in the shops of famed luthiers Nicolo Amati and Antonio Stradivari. After returning to Naples from Cremona, he became the founder of the Neapolitan school. Authentic examples of his instruments in good condition are scarce. A few violas, cellos, one double bass, and several violins have survived.

Typical label:
Alexandri [or Alessandro] Gagliano
Alumnus Antonio Stradivarius
fecit Anno 1722

Nicolò Gagliano I
(active  1730 –  1780) Naples, Italy. Nicolò Gagliano (also known as Nicolo,  Nicola or the latinised Nicolaus) was the eldest son of Alessandro and is generally considered the most famous luthier of the Gagliano family (he is known as Nicolò I to differentiate him from his grandson Nicolò II). He made many admirable instruments in his long life. His instruments have often been copied or imitated, and were occasionally even mistaken for those of Antonio Stradivari.

Typical labels:
Nicolaii Gagliano fecit
in Napoli 1711

or

Nicolaus Gagliano filius
Alexandri fecit Neap. 1752

Gennaro Gagliano
(active  1740 –  1780) Naples, Italy. The second son of Alessandro, Gennaro (also known by his latinised name Januarius) created some well-made instruments and had a prominent position in the family.

Ferdinando Gagliano

(born 1724, active  1770 –  1795) Naples, Italy. Ferdinando was the eldest son of Nicolò I although probably taught by his uncle Gennaro. He made some magnificent as well as nondescript instruments. However, he had a prodigious output of instruments. Occasionally, instruments with his label were actually made by his father or his brother. 

Labels: 
Ferdinandus Gagliano Filius / Nicolai, Fecit Neap. 17..

Ferdinando Gagliano, me fecit / Neapoli, anno 17..

References

" Ferdinand Gagliano Violin and Viola" by John Dilworth on the Amati website.

Further reading

Italian luthiers
Neapolitan families